Krushelnytsia is a village (selo) in Stryi Raion, Lviv Oblast, of Western Ukraine. It belongs to Skole urban hromada, one of the hromadas of Ukraine.
Area of the village totals is 2,42 km2 and the population of the village is about 1297 people. Local government is administered by Krushelnytsya village council.

Geography 
Krushelnytsia is located in Stryi district, on the banks of two mountain rivers – the Stryi River and the Krushelnytsia River.

History 
The first written mention of the village dates back to the year 1395 October 4, 1395 Władysław II Jagiełło, King of Poland, granted for John and Demyan village Krushelnytsia in  parish.

Until 18 July 2020, Krushelnytsia belonged to Skole Raion. The raion was abolished in July 2020 as part of the administrative reform of Ukraine, which reduced the number of raions of Lviv Oblast to seven. The area of Skole Raion was merged into Stryi Raion.

Places of worship 
The village has an architectural monuments of Cultural Heritage of Stryi Raion in Ukraine:
 Church of the Holy Trinity (wooden), built in 1842 (N - 1414/1).
 Belfry Church of the Holy Trinity (wooden) (N - 1414/2).
There are in the village wooden church of St. Nicholas, built in 1822.

References

External links 
 Населенні пункти Сколівського району  -  Крушельниця 
 weather.in.ua, Krushel'nytsia
 Крушельниця, Церква Прсв. Трійці 1842 

Villages in Stryi Raion